The 1904 Tour de France was the 1st edition of Tour de France, one of cycling's Grand Tours. The Tour began in Paris on 2 July and Stage 4 occurred on 17 July with a flat stage from Toulouse. The race finished at the Parc des Princes in Paris on 23 July.

Stage 4
17 July 1904 — Toulouse to Bordeaux,

Stage 5
20 July 1904 — Bordeaux to Nantes,

Stage 6
23 July 1904 — Nantes to Paris,

References

1904 Tour de France
Tour de France stages